Tanisha may refer to:

Tanisha (name), meaning ambition in Sanskrit, is a feminine given name and is primarily a first name.

 Tani Shah, a popularly declared title (includes a list of people with the title)

People
Tanishaa Mukerji (born January 1, 1978), Bollywood actress
Tanisha Thomas (born August 28, 1985), Reality TV Star, Host
Tanisha Mariko Harper (born September 18, 1981), model, actress and television host
Tanisha Tamara Drummond Johnson (born c. 1976), Panamanian model and beauty pageant contestant winner of the Señorita Panamá 1997
Tanisha Lynn Eanes (born September 14, 1978 in Houston, Texas), American actress
Tanisha Scott (born in Toronto, Canada), three-time MTV VMA-nominated choreographer
Tanisha Lovely Wright (born November 29, 1983), American women’s basketball player
Tanisha Nicole Brito (born September 11, 1980), beauty queen who has competed at both Miss America and Miss USA
Tanisha Malone, Winner of the 2006 edition of Mo'Nique's Fat Chance a reality TV miniseries
Tanisha Michele Morgan, member of the female rap duo group BWP (Bytches With Problems)
Tanisha Yarndriciaes Delores Neal, uses the pseudonym Toni Neal (born February 17, 1976), broadcaster
Tanisha Dutta uses the pseudonym Tina Dutta, Indian actress

Title
Abul Hasan Qutb Shah known as Abul Hasan Tani Shah, Tani Shah meaning "benevolent ruler" and `Tana Shah' which means a child saint

Places
Lake Tanisha, Dallas Paulding County, Georgia

Arts, entertainment and media

Filmography
Tanisha, the emperor of Golconda - role played by Nassar in the 2006 Telugu Devotional Movie Sri Ramadasu directed by K. Raghavendra Rao
Tanisha, role played by Wamiqa Gabbi - Sixteen (2013 Indian film) is a 2013 Hindi-language drama thriller film directed by Raj Purohit
Tanisha, role played by Zolee Griggs from 2007-2008 Cory in the house
Tanisha, role played by Tanusree Chakraborty in the 2012 Bengali drama film Bedroom (film) directed by Mainak Bhaumik
Tanisha, role played by Nicole Covington Season 2, Episode 4: A Beautiful Mess in Shameless (U.S. TV series)  an American television comedy-drama

Video Games
Tanisha Jackson is a character in the Grand Theft Auto series, appearing as a minor character in Grand Theft Auto V
Tanisha means ambition in Sanskrit.